Locked breech is the design of a breech-reloading firearm's action. This is important in understanding how a self-reloading firearm works. In the simplest terms, the locked breech is one way to slow down the opening of the breech of a self-reloading firearm when fired. The source of power for the movement is recoil.

The principle of firing a projectile from a firearm is that when the propellant in a bullet's casing is ignited, the propellant burns quickly for a very short time. This creates a high-pressure pocket of gas that expands, pushing the projectile (bullet) out of the chamber and down the barrel of the firearm. If the high-pressure gas were not confined within certain parts of the weapon, it could damage the firearm or injure the shooter. A 'locked breech' barrel confines the high-pressure gas to the barrel, allowing the gas to expand and cool without risk of damaging weapon or shooter. Because of the pressure drop, a breech block can be opened in a self-reloading firearm due to the recoil inertia generation by the movement of the projectile.

Versus other types 

 Blowback This action relies on the inertia of a breechblock to retard breech opening until pressures have dropped to safe levels.  This is not a locked breech and works by the cartridge case pushing against the breech and moving while there is pressure in the chamber. The inertia of the slide/breechblock will allow the case to move immediately but not so fast that dangerous pressures escape.
 Delayed blowback This action is found where recoil is light enough that a fully locked breech is not necessary.  Like simple blowback, it is case movement that opens the breech.  This is a more robust version of simple blowback.  Sometime a spring loaded lever is used to increase the resistance inertia of the slide/breech to keep the case in the chamber long enough to be safe.
 Locked breech This action is used when the pressure in the chamber is high enough that the opening of the breech would occur too rapidly with simple or delayed blowback which could cause weapons damage or human injury. The breechblock is "locked" into the barrel.  At the point of firing the inertia pushes the barrel and slide/breechblock backwards together for a certain distance.  This type of action utilizes the inertia of the locked together slide/breech and barrel so that its inertia prevents movement too quickly.  The locking mechanism will disengage after a certain amount of travel at which time the pressures will have dropped.

The main difference is that there is a very strong lock in the locked breech action where the blowback systems rely on the inertia of components to provide safe operation. The type of action used by a firearms designer will be determined by the design goal inherent for that firearm. The three actions described are increasingly more expensive to manufacture.

Recoil 

Recoil is described by Newton's third law of motion, which states that for every action there is an equal and opposite reaction. This force is felt in the hand or on the shoulder when a person fires a handgun or a rifle.  It takes the form of a quick sharp push away from the path the bullet is flying in and directly against the hand or shoulder of the shooter.

Mechanism 

The locked breech systems in handguns and rifle vary significantly.  The photograph showing four handgun barrels illustrates the evolution of handgun locked breech systems in four of the most famous firearms. This is from the Browning Hi-Power (I in the photograph), John Browning's last design.  The second barrel is of the same action type in the CZ model 75 handgun.  The third barrel type is from an HK USP pistol.  The fourth barrel is from a Glock (which uses the Sig Sauer system).

The photograph on the right is of a different type of locking system.  This one is the Beretta Rotary locking system found in their PX Four Storm handgun.  The next photograph on the left is of the CZ model 52 showing a roller locking system.  Some sources describe this as a delayed blowback action but it is actually a locked breech.

Examples of use
In the late 19th century, firearms makers learned how to use this mechanical force to create "self-loading" weapons, whether they were in artillery, rifles, shotguns, or handguns. The lower-powered calibers such as .22 caliber rimfire, (example gun) Walther P22 .22 Rimfire handgun were able to self-load using the energy produced by the .22 rimfire cartridges which simply blew the action open to reload a new cartridge.  (This is called simple blowback.)

As cartridges grew in size and power the amount of recoil in the chamber increased.  The energy created by larger and higher pressure cartridges, such as 9×19mm Parabellum pistol cartridge, results in violent movement of the gun's action.

In the case of simple blowback (and delayed blowback) the changes needed for a firearm to be able to control the higher amount of inertia and higher chamber pressures resulted in firearms design changes.  Some designers handled this problem by making the moving parts of the firearm heavier and the strength of the recoil spring much greater.  Firearms such as the .25 ACP Beretta SB950, take a great deal of force to chamber a round. Beretta solved this problem with a tilting barrel which allowed loading without having to pull the slide to the rear.

Gun makers developed ways to keep the actions from opening too soon by "locking" the breech closed. Using this technique a firearm, such as the Colt .45 ACP Government model handgun was made which featured a grooved barrel and a grooved slide which were cammed together to prevent the breech from opening.  The camming mechanism "locked" the breech closed until the entire barrel and slide assembly had moved far enough that the pressure in the chamber was low enough to safely unlock the breech during the process of ejecting the spent casing which was followed by loading a new loaded cartridge.  (This is called locked breech.)

Short versus long recoil 

Firearms that are physically small, such as handguns, use a system of recoil referred to as short recoil. This is adequate for the smaller calibers.  In large firearms such as the Browning M2HB .50 caliber machine gun a similar system called long recoil is used.  The difference is how far the breech moves after a shot is fired.

Locked recoil systems rely on timing to allow safe operation.  A very heavy bolt mechanism can be used (such as in sub-machineguns) to slow the rate of movement and reduce the rate of fire.  This is not adequate with higher velocity and higher energy cartridges.  Rifles and most handguns use locked breech designs to control recoil safely.

The amount of mass of the components, the strength of springs, and the distance the barrel and slide are allowed to recoil is carefully calculated and tested to ensure safety.

References

Firearm terminology